Quasimitra albocarnea is a species of sea snail, a marine gastropod mollusk, in the family Mitridae, the miters or miter snails.

Description
The length of the shell attains 25.8 mm.

Distribution
This species occurs in the Indian Ocean off Somalia.

References

 Bozzetti L. (2016). Mitra albocarnea (Neogastropoda: Muricoidea: Mitridae) nuove specie dalla Somalia Nord-Orientale. Malacologia Mostra Mondiale. 90: 12-13

albocarnea
Gastropods described in 2016